Maceda is a genus of moths of the family Nolidae first described by Francis Walker in 1857.

Description
Palpi slender, and reaching just above vertex of head. Antennae ciliated. Abdomen with coarse hair on dorsum of proximal segments. Tibia nearly naked. Forewings tuftless. Apex almost rectangular. Male with bar-shaped retinaculum. The end of the cell rounded and dilated with a small patch of ribbed hyaline (glass-like) membrane, probably for stridulation with the spines of the mid-tarsi. Hindwings with stalked veins 3 and 4.

Species

 Maceda mansueta Walker, 1858 (Australasia)
 Maceda ignefumosa Warren, 1912 (from New Guinea)
 Maceda rufibasis Warren, 1912 (from New Guinea)
 Maceda ignepicta Hampson, 1914
 Maceda savura Robinson, 1968 (from Fiji)

References

Walker, 1858. List of the Specimens of Lepidopterous Insects in the Collection of the British Museum. (13): 1122, 1140
Papua-Insects.nl

Chloephorinae